Lapaguía Zapotec, or Lapaguía-Guivini Zapotec, is a Zapotec language spoken in southern Oaxaca, Mexico.

References

Zapotec languages